Darrell Alexander Thompson (born November 23, 1967) is a former professional American football running back who played for five seasons in the National Football League (NFL) for the Green Bay Packers. He was selected by Green Bay in the first round (19th overall) of the 1990 NFL Draft.

Early life
Thompson was born in St. Louis, Missouri to George and Morsie Thompson and is the oldest of three children. Thompson comes from an athletic family; both his siblings, George Jr. and Jennifer, played collegiate volleyball, and George Thompson is the nephew of Alice Coachman, the first black woman to win an Olympic gold medal. When Darrell was one year old, the family relocated to Rochester, Minnesota.

At John Marshall High School Thompson was a three sport standout where he was all-state in track & field, a McDonald's all-American in basketball and a Gatorade all-American in football. As a three-year player, Thompson became one of the most decorated and sought after running backs in the nation.  After graduating from high school he decided to play college football for the Minnesota Golden Gophers over Nebraska, Iowa, Wisconsin, UCLA, Oklahoma and Oklahoma State.

College career
While at Minnesota, he was the starting running back for all four years and became the first Big Ten running back to rush for more than 1,000 yards as a freshman and as a sophomore. He is the university's all-time leader in career rushing yards, attempts, all-purpose yards, touchdowns and holds the record for longest run from scrimmage at 98 yards. He was then selected by the Green Bay Packers in the first round of the 1990 NFL Draft in April 1990.

*indicates bowl stats included

Professional career
During his NFL career, Thompson played in 60 games as a fullback and tailback for the Green Bay Packers. During his five seasons he gained 1,640 yards rushing, 330 yards receiving, and scored 8 touchdowns. Thompson played alongside Brett Favre, Reggie White, Leroy Butler and Sterling Sharpe.

NFL statistics

Rushing

Receiving

Kickoff Returns

Post NFL career

Thompson has been the President Director of Bolder Options, a youth mentoring nonprofit organization in that serves youth in Minneapolis, St. Paul and Rochester, since 1998. Both Thompson and Bolder Options were featured on The Today Show with Al Roker in 2006 as part of Roker's charity tour.

In 1997 Thompson was selected into the Gophers Hall of Fame, and later became a sideline reporter for the Gophers. He has served as the Minnesota Gopher football radio color commentator since 1998.

Personal life

Thompson married Stephanie Smith in 1995. The couple currently resides in Plymouth, Minnesota and have four children. Their oldest daughter, Dominique, played collegiate volleyball at University of Wisconsin–Madison and then professionally in Denmark for the 2015-2016 season. Their other daughter, Indigo, plays collegiate volleyball at San Diego State University. Their oldest son, True, plays football collegiately at the University of Minnesota and their youngest son, Race, plays basketball at Indiana University.

References

External links
 Thompson's stats

1967 births
Living people
American football fullbacks
Green Bay Packers players
Minnesota Golden Gophers football players
Sportspeople from Rochester, Minnesota
Players of American football from Minnesota